The 2010 Rhode Island gubernatorial election was held on November 2, 2010. It was preceded by the primary election on September 14, 2010. Incumbent Republican Governor Donald Carcieri was term-limited in 2010. The non-partisan Cook Political Report, The New York Times and CQ Politics rated the gubernatorial election as a toss-up.

With 90% of the districts reporting on election night, independent candidate and former U.S. senator Lincoln Chafee was declared the winner, with 36% of the vote to Republican John Robitaille's 34%. , this was the last time Newport County voted for the Republican candidate in a statewide election.

Democratic primary

Candidates
Frank Caprio, State Treasurer

Polling (D)

Results

Republican primary

Candidates
Victor Moffitt, former State Representative
John Robitaille, businessman

Polling (R)

Results

General election

Candidates

Major
 Frank Caprio (D)
 Lincoln Chafee (I)
 John Robitaille (R)

Minor
 Ronald Algieri (I)
 Ken Block (M)
 Todd Giroux (I)
 Joseph Lusi (I)

Campaign
The campaign drew nationwide attention in late October when President Barack Obama, faced with a choice between Democrat Caprio and independent Chafee (who, although he had been a Republican as a senator, had endorsed the Democratic Obama for president in 2008) chose not to make any endorsement in the race.  Caprio responded to the lack of an endorsement by his fellow Democrat by stating that the President "can take his endorsement and really shove it as far as I'm concerned."

Predictions

Polling

Results

See also
United States gubernatorial elections, 2010

References

External links
Rhode Island Board of Elections
Rhode Island Governor Candidates at Project Vote Smart
Campaign contributions for 2010 RI Governor from Follow the Money
Rhode Island Governor 2010 from OurCampaigns.com
2010 Rhode Island Gubernatorial General Election graph of multiple polls from Pollster.com
Election 2010: Rhode Island Governor from Rasmussen Reports
2010 Rhode Island Governor Race from Real Clear Politics
2010 Rhode Island Governor's Race from CQ Politics
Race Profile in The New York Times
Campaign 2010: RI Governor Race coverage by WPRI
2010 Governor's Race coverage by WRNI-FM
Debate
Rhode Island Gubernatorial Debate on C-SPAN, June 10, 2010
Official campaign sites (Archived)
Ken Block for RI Governor
Frank Caprio for RI Governor
Lincoln Chafee for RI Governor
Todd Giroux for RI Governor
Joe Lusi for RI Governor
John Robitaille for RI Governor

Gubernatorial
2010
Rhode Island
Lincoln Chafee